Hamilton Township is one of sixteen townships in Franklin County, Iowa, United States.  As of the 2010 census, its population was 155 and it contained 75 housing units.

History
Hamilton Township was created in 1871. It was named for Andrew Hamilton, a pioneer settler and native of Ireland.

Geography

Cities, towns, villages
 Coulter (southeast quarter)

Cemeteries
The township contains Saint Johns Lutheran Cemetery.

School districts
 Cal Community School District
 Dows Community School District
 Hampton-Dumont Community School District

Political districts
 Iowa's 4th congressional district
 State House District 54
 State Senate District 27

References

External links
 City-Data.com

Townships in Iowa
Townships in Franklin County, Iowa
Populated places established in 1871
1871 establishments in Iowa